Gerald Daniel Kleczka (November 26, 1943 – October 8, 2017) was an American politician and Democratic member of the United States House of Representatives from 1984 to 2005, representing . The district included the city of Milwaukee.

Life and education
After graduating from Milwaukee's Don Bosco High School, in 1961, he attended the University of Wisconsin–Milwaukee for two years. Afterward, he served as an accountant and a member of the National Guard.

Politics
Kleczka was elected to the Wisconsin State Assembly, serving from 1969 to 1974. Later, he was a member of the Wisconsin State Senate from 1975 to 1984. Kleczka was elected to the House in a special election following the death of Representative Clement J. Zablocki, defeating Milwaukee County District Attorney E. Michael McCann in the Democratic primary.

Tenure in Congress
While in Congress, Kleczka was a member of the United States House Committee on Ways and Means and later the United States House Committee on the Budget. He was known to be one of the more liberal members of Congress and helped to secure money for many programs for education, poverty relief, and housing improvements.

For his first 10-and-a-half terms, Kleczka represented a district that included most of the southern half of Milwaukee, as well as part of eastern Waukesha County. After the 2000 census, the 5th District, covering downtown and north Milwaukee and represented by fellow Democrat Tom Barrett, was eliminated, and most of its territory was merged with the 4th District. The new 4th was a more compact district located solely in Milwaukee County, and took in all of the city of Milwaukee; it was by far the most Democratic district in Wisconsin. While the 4th was more Barrett's district than Kleczka's, Barrett opted to run for governor, effectively handing the seat to Kleczka.

The pronunciation of Kleczka's name often proved baffling to the uninformed. Rep. Frank Annunzio (D-IL) repeatedly butchered it to the point that an exasperated Kleczka took to calling him "Rep. Annunciation".

Legal issues 
Kleczka was arrested at least twice for drunk driving while in office. A 1995 arrest for drunken driving — his blood alcohol content was twice the legal limit in Virginia — led him to acknowledge his alcoholism and seek treatment. He credits religion as part of the reason for his recovery and continued to meet regularly with fellow recovering alcoholics.

Retirement and death
Kleczka announced his retirement in 2004, and did not run for reelection. He officially retired in January 2005 after ten terms in Congress, and was succeeded by State Senator Gwen Moore, also a Democrat.

After Kleczka retired, he moved to Middleton, Wisconsin with his wife. Kleczka died on October 8, 2017 from natural causes at a care facility, in the Madison, Wisconsin area.

References

External links

Honorary Degree: Doctor of Laws Conferred on Jerry Kleczka , Marquette University, 2005.

|-

|-

|-

|-

1943 births
2017 deaths
20th-century American politicians
21st-century American politicians
American politicians of Polish descent
Businesspeople from Milwaukee
Democratic Party members of the United States House of Representatives from Wisconsin
Democratic Party members of the Wisconsin State Assembly
Military personnel from Milwaukee
People from Middleton, Wisconsin
Politicians from Milwaukee
University of Wisconsin–Milwaukee alumni
Democratic Party Wisconsin state senators
20th-century American businesspeople